Lieutenant-General Sir Frederick Marshall  (26 July 1829 – 8 June 1900) was a British Army officer.

Military career
Marshall was commissioned as a cornet in the 10th Hussars on 18 September 1849. He was promoted to lieutenant on 16 September 1851 and, after transferring to the 1st Regiment of Dragoons on 14 October 1851, he saw action in the Crimean War and was promoted to captain on 4 February 1859.

Marshall was promoted further to major on 6 March 1863. Promoted to lieutenant colonel on 8 March 1864, he was given command of the 2nd Regiment of Life Guards. He was then promoted to full colonel on 6 March 1868 and to major general on 20 October 1877.

After taking part in the Anglo-Zulu War in spring 1879, Marshall was appointed a Companion of the Order of St Michael and St George on 19 December 1879. He was promoted to lieutenant general on his retirement on 5 September 1884 and advanced to Knight Commander of the Order of St Michael and St George on 22 June 1897.

Marshall served as colonel of the 1st (Royal) Dragoons from 1890 to 1900.

First-class cricket
Marshall played first-class cricket for several teams in the 1850s and 1860s, debuting for the Marylebone Cricket Club (MCC) against Sussex at Horsham in 1854. Playing first-class cricket until 1865, the played eight matches for the MCC, but also appeared five times for the Gentlemen of Marylebone Cricket Club, four times for the Gentlemen of England, twice for the South in the North v South fixture, and once each for the Gentlemen of the South and the Surrey Club. Appearing in 21 first-class matches, he scored a total of 244 runs at an average of 7.87, with a highest score of 31.

References

1829 births
1900 deaths
Military personnel from Kent
British Army generals
Knights Commander of the Order of St Michael and St George
People from Edenbridge, Kent
English cricketers
Marylebone Cricket Club cricketers
Gentlemen of England cricketers
Surrey Club cricketers
Gentlemen of Marylebone Cricket Club cricketers
North v South cricketers
Gentlemen of the South cricketers